Madeleine Garnier (born October 9, 1991), known as her stage name Suoreen, is a French singer and songwriter who slowly gained recognition after starting to post videos on YouTube at the age of 18.

After her audition at the French show Pop Idol, which she didn't pass, she moved to London to pursue a music career. There, she started posting videos on YouTube and demos on SoundCloud, attracting the attention of independent labels, with whom she worked. She didn't come into prominence until 2015, when she released her official debut single "Sandwich", co-written by Australian hitmaker Sia. The song was met with critical acclaim and moderate commercial success in mainland Europe, peaking within the top 20 in Sweden, the top 50 in Germany, Austria and Switzerland and within the top 100 in her home country, France.

In December 2015, Suoreen released her debut album, Poor People, through Capitol Records, preceded by another Sia-penned single, "Unugly". The EDM-influenced album was mainly produced by the team of producers Stargate, who has previously worked with Selena Gomez and Rihanna.

Suoreen explained the origin of her name in an interview with the Italian magazine Vogue: "Suoreen is a word with no meaning, so I decided to give it one. It has a full, round sound, and pronouncing it I feel in peace with myself and with the world. Try to say Suoreen out aloud... all your problems will be solved."

Discography

Studio albums

Singles

References

1991 births
Living people